The 2003 Beach Soccer World Championships was the ninth edition of the Beach Soccer World Championships, the most prestigious competition in international beach soccer contested by men's national teams until 2005, when the competition was then replaced by the second iteration of a world cup in beach soccer, the better known FIFA Beach Soccer World Cup. It was organized by Brazilian sports agency Koch Tavares in cooperation with and under the supervision of Beach Soccer Worldwide (BSWW), the sports governing body.

For the first time since 2000, the tournament returned to its native venue at Copacabana Beach in Rio de Janeiro, Brazil. The main sponsor was McDonald's.

The tournament saw Brazil win their eighth title by beating first time finalists Spain.

Organisation
As like in the previous year, a record low of eight nations competed in two groups of four teams in a round robin format. The top two teams in each group after all the matches of the group stage had been played progressed into the semi-finals, in which the championship proceeded as a knock-out tournament therein until a winner was crowned, with an additional match to decide third place.

Teams

Qualification
European teams gained qualification by finishing in the top three spots of the 2002 Euro Beach Soccer League. North and South American qualification was based on performances over recent times in a series of events involving teams from the Americas. The other entries received wild-card invites.

Africa and Oceania were unrepresented.

Entrants
This remains the only year in all nineteen editions when no new nations made their debut at a world cup.

Asian Zone (1):
WC

European Zone (4):

WC

North American Zone (1):

South American Zone (1):

Hosts:
 (South America)

Group stage
Matches are listed as local time in Rio de Janeiro, (UTC-3)

Group A

Group B

Knockout stage
February 21 was allocated as a rest day.

Semi-finals

Third place play-off

Final

Winners

Awards

Top goalscorers

15 goals
 Neném 
10 goals
 Amarelle 
 Madjer 
9 goals
 Júnior Negão 
8 goals
 Sciortino 
 Benjamin 
6 goals
 Nico 
5 goals
 Bonora 
 Alan 

4 goals
 Jorginho  
 Fruzzetti 
 Eloy 
3 goals
 Q. Setién
 Francis 
 Beto 
 Samoun 
 Jairzinho 
 Marquet 
 Cantona 
 Hernani 
 Nico 

2 goals
 Buru 
 Juninho 
 D’Amico 
 Ferrigno 
 Garlini  
 Fabian
 German 
 Mochizuki 
 Ottavy 
 Belchior 
15 others scored 1 goal each

Final standings

References

Sources
RSSSF
roonba
BSWW
Big Soccer
Awards
Scorers (incomplete)

2003
2003
2003 in beach soccer
2003 in Brazilian football